Philip G. Atwell is an American music video, television commercial and feature film director. Starting out as a music video producer, he took up directing in 1999. Often co-directing with Dr. Dre, he has helped out with many music videos for Eminem and other hip hop artists.

In 2000, Atwell directed and executive-produced the concert documentary The Up in Smoke Tour. He also produced and co-wrote Murder Was the Case, a short movie released in 1995 by Death Row Records, directed by Dr. Dre and starring Snoop Dogg. In 2001, he produced DJ Pooh's feature film The Wash featuring Dr. Dre, Snoop Dogg, Xzibit and Eminem, among others. In 2005, he executive-produced both Damon Johnson's The Game: Documentary and Donn J. Viola's Eminem Presents: The Anger Management Tour.

In 2003, Atwell directed The Turbo Charged Prelude for 2 Fast 2 Furious, a short film bridging The Fast and the Furious with its sequel, as well as "Severance Pay", a one-minute-movie for NBC's  1MMs series.

Atwell also directed two episodes of The Shield and served as second unit director on both National Treasure movies.

In 2007, he directed his first fiction feature, War, which starred Jet Li and Jason Statham.

Atwell is a 1987 graduate of the University of Delaware, where he was a member of the football team.

Filmography as director

Feature films 
 The Up in Smoke Tour (2000)
 War (2007)

Short films 
 The Turbo Charged Prelude for 2 Fast 2 Furious (2003)

TV series 
 1 episode of 1MMs: "Severance Pay" (2003)
 2 episodes of The Shield: "Trophy" (2006) and "String Theory" (2005)

Music videos 
 Eminem – "My Name Is" (1999) (co-directed by Dr. Dre)
 Eminem feat. Dr. Dre – "Guilty Conscience" (1999) (co-directed by Dr. Dre)
 Eminem – "Role Model" (1999) (co-directed by Dr. Dre)
 Snoop Dogg feat. Xzibit & Nate Dogg – "Bitch Please" (1999) (co-directed by Dr. Dre)
 Snoop Dogg feat. Dr. Dre & Jewell – "Just Dippin (1999)
 Dr. Dre feat. Eminem – "Forgot About Dre" (2000)
 Xzibit – "Year 2000" (2000) (co-directed by Xzibit)
 Eminem – "The Real Slim Shady" (2000) (co-directed by Dr. Dre)
 Ice Cube feat. Dr. Dre & MC Ren – "Hello" (2000)
 Eminem feat. Dido – "Stan" (2000) (co-directed by Dr. Dre)
 Eve feat. Gwen Stefani – "Let Me Blow Ya Mind" (2001)
 Kool G Rap – "My Life" (2001)
 Dr. Dre feat. Knoc-turn'al – "Bad Intentions" (2001) (co-directed by Dr. Dre)
 Marilyn Manson – "Tainted Love" (2001)
 Truth Hurts feat. Rakim – "Addictive" (2002)
 Eminem – "Cleanin' Out My Closet" (2002) (co-directed by Dr. Dre)
 Eminem – "Lose Yourself" (2002) (co-directed by Eminem & Paul Rosenberg)
 50 Cent – "In da Club" (2003)
 Eminem – "Sing for the Moment" (2003)
 50 Cent feat. Nate Dogg – "21 Questions" (2003) (co-directed by Dr. Dre & Damon Johnson)
 Obie Trice – "Got Some Teeth" (2003) (co-directed by Eminem)
 Tupac feat. The Notorious B.I.G. – "Runnin' (Dying to Live)" (2004)
 D12 – "My Band" (2004) (co-directed by Eminem)
 Simple Plan – "Welcome to My Life" (2004)
 Eminem – "Just Lose It" (2004)
 The Game – "Dreams" (2005)
 Eminem – "Ass Like That" (2005)
 Atarashii Gakko! – "Pineapple Kryptonite" (2021)

References

External links 

Philip G. Atwell at the Music Video DataBase
Geronimo Film Productions, his production company

American music video directors
Music video producers
Year of birth missing (living people)
Living people
African-American film directors
Delaware Fightin' Blue Hens football players
Advertising directors
American film directors
20th-century African-American people
21st-century African-American people